Carlos Jiménez Díaz (February 10, 1898 – May 18, 1967) was an important Spanish physician and clinical researcher.

References 

1898 births
1967 deaths
Complutense University of Madrid
Recipients of the Order of Isabella the Catholic